The Civil War Defenses of Washington were a group of Union Army fortifications that protected the federal capital city, Washington, D.C., from invasion by the Confederate States Army during the American Civil War (see Washington, D.C., in the American Civil War). 

Today, the sites of some of these fortifications are within a collection of National Park Service (NPS) properties that the National Register of Historic Places identifies as the Fort Circle. The sites of other such fortifications in the area have become parts of state, county, or city parks or are located on privately owned properties. A trail connecting the sites is part of the Potomac Heritage Trail.

Parts of the earthworks of some such fortifications still exist. Others have been completely demolished.

History

Civil War

During the American Civil War, Union forces built in the Washington area 68 major enclosed forts, used to house soldiers and store artillery and other supplies. They also built 93 prepared (but unarmed) batteries for field guns and seven blockhouses. There were also 20 miles of rifle pits and 30 miles of connecting military roads. The Confederacy never captured any of these forts, though some came under enemy fire.  

Most were built on the limits of the city, which had remained relatively rural. Most of the land was privately owned and taken over by the military at the beginning of the Civil War. 

Here are some examples:
 Fort Slemmer: A 24-acre plot was owned by Henry Douglas, a florist. Flowers, 1,970 fruit trees, vines, bushes, and other plants were destroyed to complete the fort. This made the land owner unable to work in this trade.
 Fort Reno: The land belonged to Giles and Miles Dyer. The farmhouse was used by the Army as the headquarters for various commands encamped in the area. The fortification covered 20 acres of land. Some 50 more acres were used for barracks, camps, and a parade ground.
 Forts Chaplin and Craven: These forts were built on land belonging to Selby B. Scaggs. He owned a farm there totaling about 400 acres and worth $52,000. Four laborers also lived there.
 Fort DeRussy: The fort was built on land owned by Bernard S. Swart, a clerk. He lived there with his wife, three children and two farmhands. Today his land is part of Rock Creek Park.
 Fort DuPont: The fort was built on the land owned by 60-year-old Michael Caton, worth $5,000 in 1860. He lived there with his wife, five children (aged 18 to 30), and one domestic worker.
 Fort Slocum: The fort was in part built on the land owned by John F. Callan, also a clerk. He lived there with his wife and their eight children (aged 8 to 24).
 Fort Bayard: The fort was built on land belonging to a farmer named Philip J. Buckey, who lived there with his wife, four children and two servants.
 Battery Kemble and part of Fort Gaines: The land was owned by William A.T. Maddox, a U.S. Marine Corps captain stationed in Philadelphia.
 Fort Stevens: The land belonged to Emory Methodist Church. Some some land may have belonged to Elizabeth Thomas, a free black woman. Her house was demolished in the process. Documentation for her ownership was never discovered but the story has become part of the local folklore.

The forts in the District of Columbia were temporary structures. They were in most part built of earthen embankments, timber with limited masonry and were surrounded by trenches and flanked with abatis. They were not designed to serve beyond the Civil War as the land was intended to be returned to its owners at that time.

Most of these owners lost possession of their land for the duration of the war and were unable to receive income from it. Only a few received compensation or rent from the land during the war.

Development of the "Fort Circle"

As early as 1898, an interest in connecting the forts by a road was proposed. Known as the Fort Drive, it would connect all the forts from the east of the city to the west.

In 1919 the Commissioners of the District of Columbia pushed Congress to pass a bill to consolidate the aging forts into a "Fort Circle" system of parks that would ring the growing city of Washington. As envisioned by the Commissioners, the Fort Circle would be a green ring of parks outside the city, owned by the government, and connected by a "Fort Drive" road in order to allow Washington's citizens to easily escape the confines of the capital. However, the bill allowing for the purchase of the former forts, which had been turned back over to private ownership after the war, failed to pass both the House of Representatives and Senate.

Despite that failure, in 1925 a similar bill passed both the House and Senate, which allowed for the creation of the National Capital Parks Commission (NCPC) to oversee the construction of a Fort Circle of parks similar to that proposed in 1919. The NCPC was authorized to begin purchasing land occupied by the old forts, much of which had been turned over to private ownership following the war. Records indicate that the site of Fort Stanton was purchased for a total of $56,000 in 1926. The duty of purchasing land and constructing the fort parks changed hands several times throughout the 1920s and 1930s, eventually culminating with the Department of the Interior and the National Park Service taking control of the project in the 1940s.

During the Great Depression, crews from the Civilian Conservation Corps embarked on projects to improve and maintain the parks, which were still under the control of District authority at that time. At Fort Stanton, CCC members trimmed trees and cleared brush, as well as maintaining and constructing park buildings. Various non-park buildings were also discussed for the land. The City Department of Education proposed building a school on park land, while authorities from the local water utility suggested the construction of a water tower would be suitable for the tall hills of the park. The Second World War interrupted these plans, and post-war budget cuts instituted by President Harry S. Truman postponed the construction of the Fort Drive once more. Though land for the parks had mostly been purchased, construction of the ring road connecting them was pushed back again and again. Other projects managed to find funding, however. In 1949, President Truman approved a supplemental appropriation request of $175,000 to construct "a swimming pool and associated facilities" at Fort Stanton Park.

By 1963, when President John F. Kennedy began pushing Congress to finally build the Fort Circle Drive, many in Washington and the National Park Service were openly questioning whether the plan had outgrown its usefulness. After all, by this time, Washington had grown past the ring of forts that had protected it a century earlier, and city surface roads already connected the parks, albeit not in as linear a route as envisioned. The plan to link the fort parks via a grand drive was quietly dropped in the years that followed.

Administration
The National Capital Parks (NCP) unit of the NPS administers all of the properties that contain the Fort Circle's sites. The National Capital Parks-East unit of the NCP administers Forts Foote, Greble, Stanton, Ricketts, Davis, Dupont, Chaplin, Mahan and Battery Carroll in the District of Columbia and Maryland.  The Rock Creek Park unit of the NCP administers Forts Bunker Hill, Totten, Slocum, Stevens, DeRussy, Reno, Bayard, Battery Kemble and Battleground National Cemetery in the District of Columbia. The George Washington Memorial Parkway unit of the NCP administers Fort Marcy in Virginia.

Fortifications

The 1865 map shows the following fortifications, some of which no longer exist. Forts in italic type are included in the National Register of Historic Places listing.

Northwest Quadrant
 Fort Cross (MD)
 Fort Kirby (MD)
 Fort Sumner (MD) 
 Battery Alexander (MD)
 Fort Simmons (MD)
 Fort Davis (MD)
 Battery Benson (MD)
 Battery Bailey (MD)
 Fort Mansfield (MD)
 Battery Cameron 
 Battery Parrott 
 Battery Kemble 
 Battery Martin Scott 
 Battery Vermont 
 Fort Bayard 
 Fort Gaines
 Fort Reno 
 Battery Rossell
 Fort Kearny
 Battery Terrill
 Battery Smead
 Battery Kingsbury
 Fort De Russy 
 Battery Sill
 Fort Stevens

Northeast Quadrant

 Fort Slocum 
 Fort Totten 
 Fort Slemmer 
 Fort Bunker Hill 
 Fort Saratoga 
 Fort Thayer 
 Fort Lincoln

Eastern Branch
 Fort Mahan 
 Fort Chaplin 
 Fort Meigs
 Fort Dupont  
 Fort Davis  
 Fort Baker
 Fort Wagner
 Fort Ricketts  
 Fort Stanton  
 Fort Snyder
 Fort Carroll  
 Fort Greble

Potomac Approaches
  Fort Foote, MD 
 Battery Rogers, VA 
 Fort Washington, MD

Arlington Line – Virginia

From North to South:
 Fort Marcy 
 Fort Ethan Allen
 Fort C. F. Smith
 Fort Bennett
 Fort Strong (formerly Fort DeKalb) 
 Fort Corcoran
 Fort Haggerty
 Fort Morton
 Fort Woodbury
 Fort Cass (later within Fort Myer)
 Fort Whipple (later within Fort Myer)
 Fort Tillinghast
 Fort McPherson
 Fort Buffalo
 Fort Ramsay
 Fort Craig
 Fort Albany
 Fort Jackson
 Fort Runyon
 Fort Richardson
 Fort Barnard
 Fort Berry
 Fort Scott
 Battery Garesche
 Fort Reynolds
 Fort Ward
 Fort Worth
 Fort Williams
 Fort Ellsworth
 Fort Lyon
 Fort Farnsworth
 Fort Weed
 Fort O'Rourke
 Fort Willard

See also
Field artillery in the American Civil War
Siege artillery in the American Civil War
Seacoast defense in the United States (Fort Washington, Fort Foote, and Battery Rodgers)
Parrott rifle
List of forts in the United States

Notes

References

External links

National Park Service: Civil War Defenses of Washington
, NRHP
, NRHP
Floyd, Dale E. Civil War Defenses of Washington, D.C., National Cable Satellite Corporation, March 14, 2012

American Civil War forts in Virginia

Forts in Maryland
Military facilities on the National Register of Historic Places in Washington, D.C.
American Civil War on the National Register of Historic Places